Homenaje a Las Grandes is the sixth major label studio album by Regional Mexican singer Jenni Rivera, released by Fonovisa on April 1, 2003. It is a tribute album.

Track listing

Charts

References

Fonovisa Records albums
Jenni Rivera albums
2003 albums
Covers albums